The Bronson Centre is a community facility in Ottawa, Ontario, Canada, which provides office and meeting facilities for non-profit organizations. It is located at 211 Bronson Avenue, on the western edge of the city's downtown core.

The building was the original site of Immaculata High School, which was originally constructed in 1928 and expanded several times until the school relocated in 1994. The Grey Sisters religious order, owners of the building, spent CA$400,000 to transform the building into office space and other community facilities. The facility reopened as the Bronson Centre in 1996, operating under a non-profit administration.

Theatre
The main theatre facility has a capacity of 900 seats and has featured concerts by musicians such as Jello Biafra, Matthew Good, Emily Haines, Melanie C, Sarah Harmer, Lady Gaga and Sigur Rós.

References

External links
 Bronson Centre official site
 

Buildings and structures in Ottawa
Music venues in Ottawa